Candies is a Philippine television lifestyle show broadcast by QTV. Hosted by Alynna Asistio, Inah de Belen, Andi Manzano, Wynwyn Marquez and Rhian Ramos, it premiered on November 12, 2005. The show concluded on June 17, 2006 with a total of 31 episodes.

2005 Philippine television series debuts
2006 Philippine television series endings
Filipino-language television shows
Philippine television shows
Q (TV network) original programming